Allyson is a given name and family name, a variant form of Alison.

People with the given name Allyson
 Allyson Hennessy (1948-2011), Trinidadian television presenter
 Allyson Schwartz (born 1948), American politician
 Allyson Kay Duncan (born 1951), federal judge on the United States Court of Appeals for the Fourth Circuit
 Allyson Clay (born 1953), Canadian visual artist
 Allyson Maynard Gibson (born 1957), Bahamian barrister, politician and community rights advocate
 Allyson McConnell (1978-2013), Australian convicted killer who drowned her two children in Canada
 Allyson (footballer, born 1982), Allyson Araújo Santos, Brazilian football centre-back
 Allyson Felix (born 1985), American track and field sprint athlete
 Allyson (footballer, born 1990), Allyson Aires dos Santos, Brazilian football defender
 Ally Brooke (born 1993), singer in the American girl band Fifth Harmony

People with the surname Allyson

 June Allyson (1917–2006), Golden Globe-winning American film and television actress
 Karrin Allyson (21st century), Grammy-nominated jazz vocalist

See also

 Alison (name)
 Allison (surname)
 Alyson
Alisoun (disambiguation)